Peseckendorf is a village and a former municipality in the Börde district in Saxony-Anhalt, Germany. Since January 1, 2010, it is part of the municipality Oschersleben.

Former municipalities in Saxony-Anhalt
Oschersleben